Thomas Weaver was a member of the Wisconsin State Assembly.

Biography
Weaver was born on October 1, 1822, in Sussex, England. He moved with his family to Oneida County, New York in 1830 before eventually settling in Lisbon, Waukesha County, Wisconsin. Weaver's father, James Weaver, would become a member of the Assembly and his brother Richard Weaver, would become a member of the Assembly and of the Wisconsin State Senate.

On April 8, 1847, Weaver married Betty Craven. They would have thirteen children. Weaver died on July 25, 1885.

Assembly career
Weaver was a member of the Assembly during the 1865 session. He was a Democrat.

References

External links

People from Sussex
19th-century English politicians
English emigrants to the United States
People from Oneida County, New York
People from Lisbon, Waukesha County, Wisconsin
Democratic Party members of the Wisconsin State Assembly
1822 births
1885 deaths
Burials in Wisconsin
19th-century American politicians